The 2008 Milwaukee Bonecrushers season was the 1st season for the Continental Indoor Football League (CIFL) expansion franchise. The franchise made an immediate splash in Milwaukee when it announced former Green Bay Packer Gilbert Brown signed a three-year contract to be the team's first head coach.  However, the optimism quickly faded when Brown announced he was resigning from the position after just three games on April 8, 2008.  Much of the team's staff and many of the team's players also left at the same time, raising eyebrows among the Milwaukee media and fans. The Bonecrushers finished 2008 with a hodgepodge of players and coaches, winning just one game, a 51-46 road contest against the Muskegon Thunder featuring a 26-yard touchdown run by Bonecrushers' quarterback Brian Ryczkowski on the final play of the game.  

The rumored reasoning behind the exodus of many of the original members of the franchise was the team's inability to pay its bills or personnel.  This was confirmed when a judgment was entered against the Bonecrushers in favor of Challenger Industries, the company that sold the team its game field AstroTurf, in the amount of $29,539.29 on October 15, 2008.  Challenger resolved its claim against John Burns, one of the owners of the Milwaukee Bonecrushers, prior to the matter going to trial.

Schedule

Standings

References

Milwaukee Bonecrushers
2008 Continental Indoor Football League season
Milwaukee Bonecrushers